Dongbu Expressway is an urban expressway located in Gyeonggi and Seoul, South Korea.

Stopovers
 Seoul
 Songpa District - Gangnam District - Gwangjin District - Seongdong District - Dongdaemun District / Gwangjin District - Dongdaemun District / Jungnang District - Nowon District
 Gyeonggi Province
 Uijeongbu

List of Facilities 

IC : Interchange (나들목)JC : Junction (분기점)IS : Intersection (평면교차로)BR : Bridge (교량)

See also 
 Roads and expressways in South Korea
 Transportation in South Korea

External links 
 MOLIT South Korean Government Transport Department

References

1986 establishments in South Korea
Gyeonggi Province
Transport in Seoul
Roads in Gyeonggi
Roads in Seoul